Szarek  is a Polish-language surname. Archaic feminine forms: Szarkowa (after husband), Szarkówna (maiden)
Notable people with this surname include:

Jan Szarek (1936-2020), Polish bishop
Jarosław Szarek
Piotr Szarek
Przemysław Szarek
Stanisław Szarek

Polish-language surnames